Hoffmans may refer to:
 Hoffmans, New Jersey, an unincorporated community in Hunterdon County, New Jersey,  United States
Hoffmans, New York, a hamlet in  Schenectady County, New York, United States

See also 
Hoffman (disambiguation)